Dustin Brown was the defending champion, but lost to Izak van der Merwe in the semifinals.
Izak van der Merwe won the title, defeating Rik de Voest 6–7(2), 7–5, 6–3 in the final.

Seeds

Draw

Finals

Top half

Bottom half

References
 Main Draw
 Qualifying Draw

Soweto Open - Singles
2011 Men's Singles